Tashi Dendup (born 22 February 1998) is a male Bhutanese sprinter. He competed in the 100 metres event at the 2015 World Championships in Athletics in Beijing, China.

See also
 Bhutan at the 2015 World Championships in Athletics

References

Bhutanese male sprinters
Living people
Place of birth missing (living people)
1998 births
World Athletics Championships athletes for Bhutan